(phosphatase 2A protein)-leucine-carboxy methyltransferase (leucine carboxy methyltransferase-1, LCMT1) is an enzyme with systematic name S-adenosyl-L-methionine:(phosphatase 2A protein)-leucine O-methyltransferase. This enzyme catalyses the following chemical reaction

 S-adenosyl-L-methionine + [phosphatase 2A protein]-leucine  S-adenosyl-L-homocysteine + [phosphatase 2A protein]-leucine methyl ester

Methylates the C-terminal leucine of phosphatase 2A.

References

External links 
 

EC 2.1.1